This is a list of seasons completed by the Utah Blaze. The Blaze are a professional arena football franchise of the Arena Football League (AFL), based in Salt Lake City, Utah. The team was established in 2006, and currently plays their home games at EnergySolutions Arena. In their first three seasons of existence, the Blaze made the playoffs in every season of their existence, but never won a playoff game. In the 2008 season, the team lost their first nine games, but after winning the last six out of seven games of the regular season, clinched a playoff berth along with two other teams who finished with a 6–10 record. Prior to the 2009 season, the AFL announced that it had suspended operations indefinitely and canceled the 2009 season.  

During the league suspension, the Utah Valley Thunder of the American Indoor Football Association started in 2009, playing that season in the league, and joined Arena Football One for the 2010 season.  After Arena Football One won the auction of the former Arena Football League's assets, on January 26, 2010, the Thunder's ownership announced the team would assume the Blaze name, as well as its history, allowed as part of the terms of the sale.

NOTE:  The 2010 Utah Blaze of the Arena Football League started in 2009 as the Utah Valley Thunder of the AIFA, and that record is included.

References
General
 

Specific

Arena Football League seasons by team
Utah Blaze seasons
Utah sports-related lists